TechnoKill is the fifth novel of the military science fiction StarFist Saga by American writers David Sherman and Dan Cragg. This book in the series once again follows 3rd Platoon, Company L, 34th FIST under Gunnery Sergeant Bass. This time they head to an alien planet to hatch open a nefarious conspiracy of corruption at the highest levels of Confederation power.

External links 

2000 science fiction novels
StarFist series
2000 novels
Del Rey books